Maciej Benedykt Golubiewski (born May 7, 1976) is a Polish political scientist and diplomat. Between 2017 and 2019 he served as the Consul General at the Consulate General of the Republic of Poland in New York City.

Biography
Golubiewski was born in Łódź, Poland. He passed the International Baccalaureate exams at United World College of the Atlantic in Great Britain (1995). He graduated Phi Beta Kappa and summa cum laude from Washington and Lee University (1999) with a Bachelor of Arts degree in Philosophy, Politics, and Economics. He later studied political science at Johns Hopkins University (Master of Arts, 2005).

For ten years Golubiewski lived in Washington DC, working in business consulting and cooperating with NGOs, think tanks, and universities, such as Center for Family and Human Rights. He was an intern at US Senator Richard Lugar's office. From 2005–08 he was a PhD student at Johns Hopkins University and the University of Mannheim. 

In 2008, he joined the European Commission in Brussels, and in 2011 in the newly established European External Action Service. Golubiewski dealt with the regional policy of eastern Africa and the countries of the Indian Ocean, participating in trade negotiations with the ACP economic bloc. From 2014 to 2016, he was the deputy ambassador of the European Union to the EU Delegation in Beirut and its head of the political and media section. 

Between 2017 and 2019 Golubiewski was Consul General at the Consulate General of the Republic of Poland in New York City. In October 2019, he became head of the office of the European Commissioner for Agriculture and Rural Development, Janusz Wojciechowski.

Golubiewski is a member of the advisory committee at The Catholic University of America. He was an expert at the Sobieski Institute and the National Center for Strategic Studies.

References 

1976 births
Consuls-General of Poland
Johns Hopkins University alumni
Living people
Diplomats from Łódź
Polish expatriates in the United States
Polish officials of the European Union
Polish political scientists
Washington and Lee University alumni
People educated at Atlantic College
People educated at a United World College